Kay Bank Studios was a recording studio in Minneapolis, Minnesota at 2541 Nicollet Avenue, now Creation Audio. Daniel Heilicher and his brother Amos started in a business together in the 1930s, distributing and stocking jukeboxes. In 1954, they founded Soma Records ("Amos" backwards), and started producing records in cooperation with Vernon Bank, owner of Kay Bank Studios.

Eventually a number of huge hits would come out of their efforts at the studio, including the Fendermen's "Muleskinner Blues", Dave Dudley's "Six Days on the Road", the Trashmen's "Surfin' Bird", and The Castaways' "Liar, Liar". Those last two singles were hits from Minneapolis's golden, mid-1960s era of teenage rock, and their success inspired countless garage bands to entertain dreams of one-hit-wonderdom.

Among those who traveled to Minneapolis to record were Bobby Vee's band the Shadows ("Susie Baby"), and Chad Allan and the Reflections (later the Expressions, who became The Guess Who), who recorded "Shakin' All Over".

The principle record labels who used Kay Bank services for recording, pressing and distribution:

Applause, Bangar, Garrett, Golden Wing, Kay Bee, Lodestar, North Star, Pleasant Peasant, Re-Car, Soma, Studio City and Twin Town.

Kay Bank employed a matrix starting with the letters KB followed by a 2,3, or 4 digit number.  In the year 1960, Capitol records used the letters kb (lowercase) for their custom records division.  These can be identified by the dash between the letters and numbers, which Kay Bank does not have. Beginning in December 1964, the matrix dropped the KB letters in favor of the year of production followed by a dash and a four digit number, such as 5-5477.  This can be interpreted as the 5477th record produced by Kay Bank, in the year 1965.

In the 1980s, the Nicollet Avenue building would become the headquarters of influential independent record label Twin/Tone Records.

In 2015 the historic recording studio was incorporated as a 501(c)3 nonprofit by Eliot Skinner.

See also
Music of Minnesota

References

External links
Kay Bank logo
Kay Bank discography
Twin Cities recording studios
Current Kay Bank Recording Website

Companies based in Edina, Minnesota
Recording studios in the United States